Eupalamides geron is a moth in the Castniidae family. It is found in Brazil.

References

Moths described in 1839
Castniidae
Fauna of Brazil
Moths of South America
Insects of South America